This is a list of electoral results for the Division of Burt in Australian federal elections from the division's creation in 2016

Members

Election results

Elections in the 2020s

2022

Elections in the 2010s

2019

2016

References

Australian federal electoral results by division